Swamper may refer to:

Swamp Yankee, a resident of the swamps of southeastern New England, sometimes called Swampers
A member of the Muscle Shoals Rhythm Section, informally known as The Swampers
Swamper (occupational title), slang term which refers to an assistant worker, helper, maintenance person, or someone who performs odd jobs